PWI may refer to:

 Pro Wrestling Illustrated, an American magazine
 Public Windows Interface, a Sun initiative to create an open Windows API
 Process Window Index, a statistical measure that quantifies the robustness of a manufacturing process
 Perfect World International, a free-to-play MMORPG
 Pune Warriors India, a defunct Indian Premier League team